"Don't Take Away the Music" is a hit song by R&B/disco group Tavares, released in the fall of 1976. It peaked at number 34 on the US Billboard Hot 100 singles chart and at number four in the UK. Along with the track "Heaven Must Be Missing an Angel", the song spent two weeks at number 1 on the Hot Dance Club Play chart.

Chart performance

Weekly charts

References

External links
 

1976 songs
1976 singles
Capitol Records singles
Songs written by Freddie Perren
Tavares (group) songs
Songs about music
Disco songs
Soul songs
Songs written by Keni St. Lewis